Timothy D. Dukes (born September 30, 1964) is an American politician. He is a Republican member of the Delaware House of Representatives, representing District 40. He was elected in 2012 after the retirement of Republican Clifford Lee.

Electoral history
In 2012, Dukes won the general election with 5,552 votes (62.7%) against Democratic nominee Benjamin Lowe.
In 2014, Dukes was unopposed in the general election and won 4,306 votes.
In 2016, Dukes was unopposed in the general election and won 7,826 votes.
In 2018, Dukes was unopposed in the general election and won 5,848 votes.

References

External links
Official page at the Delaware General Assembly
Campaign site
 

1964 births
Living people
Republican Party members of the Delaware House of Representatives
21st-century American politicians
People from Seaford, Delaware
People from Laurel, Delaware